Middlesbrough Priory was a priory in Middlesbrough, North Yorkshire, England. It was founded in 1119 by Robert de Brus as a Benedictine house.

On 1 January 1539, the priory was leased free-of-charge to four men. It has been suggested that this was to shield it from confiscation during the Dissolution of the Monasteries.

No trace remains of the priory.

References

Monasteries in North Yorkshire